Polly Irvin is a British Time Out award-winning theatre director, actress and author, and former head of the BA programme in theatre directing at London drama school Rose Bruford College.

Career
Irvin trained as an actress at Central School of Speech and Drama in London, and upon graduating worked as an actress in theatre and television for nearly a decade before turning to directing. She founded Wild Iris theatre company in 1992, for which she directed theatre productions at the Bristol Old Vic theatre, the Tricycle Theatre, the Bush Theatre and the Battersea Arts Centre. As a freelance director she directed Shakespeare's As You Like It at the Bristol Old Vic, and a devised adaptation of Hansel and Gretel for the Lyric Hammersmith in London.

In 2002, Irvin published her first book, Directing for the Stage, a series of interviews with contemporary theatre directors including Deborah Warner, Robert Lepage and Trevor Nunn.

References

External links
 Rose Bruford College
 

People associated with Rose Bruford College
Alumni of the Royal Central School of Speech and Drama
Living people
Year of birth missing (living people)